Rajni Bector is an Indian industrialist who founded Mrs Bectors Food Specialities and Cremica Group of Companies. She was awarded India's fourth-highest civilian award, the Padma Shri, in 2021.

References

Living people
Year of birth missing (living people)
Recipients of the Padma Shri
Indian businesspeople
Indian business executives